Celles is the name of several places:

Wallonia, Belgium
Celles, Hainaut, a municipality located in the province of Hainaut
Celles, Houyet, a village in the municipality of Houyet, province of Namur; marks the farthest point the German Army advanced during the Battle of the Bulge in World War II
Celles, Faimes, a village in the municipality of Faimes, province of Liège

France
 Celles, Ariège, a commune in the Ariège département
 Celles, Cantal, a commune in the Cantal département
 Celles, Charente-Maritime, a commune in the Charente-Maritime département
 Celles, Dordogne, a commune in the Dordogne département
 Celles, Hérault, a commune in the Hérault département
 Celles-en-Bassigny, a commune in the Haute-Marne département
 Celles-lès-Condé, a commune in the Aisne département 
 Celles-sur-Aisne, a commune in the Aisne département
 Celles-sur-Belle, a commune in the Deux-Sèvres département
 Celles-sur-Durolle, a commune in the Puy-de-Dôme département
 Celles-sur-Ource, a commune in the Aube département 
 Celles-sur-Plaine, a commune in the Vosges département

Spain
 Celles (Noreña), a parish of Noreña, Asturias